A list of theatres and concert halls in Spain:

Andalusia

Teatro Andalucía
Teatro Apolo (Almería)
Black Box Teatro
Teatro romano de Cádiz
Teatro Calderón (Motril)
Teatro-Cine Cardenio
Teatro Central de Sevilla
Teatro Cerezo
Teatro Ciudad de Marbella
Sala Compañía
Teatro El jardinito
Teatro Florida
Foro Iberoamericano de La Rábida
Gran Teatro (Huelva)
Gran Teatro Falla
Teatro de Las Lagunas
Teatro Lope de Vega (Sevilla)
Teatro de la Maestranza
Teatro Municipal Pedro Muñoz Seca
Real Teatro de las Cortes
Teatro Sanjuan Écija
Teatro Coliseo España
Teatro Principal (Puerto Real)
Teatro romano de Itálica
Teatro-cine Torcal
Teatro Vicente Espinel
Teatro Villamarta

Córdoba

Teatro de la Axerquía
Teatro Cómico (Córdoba)
Teatro Duque de Rivas
Teatro Góngora
Gran Teatro de Córdoba
Teatro romano de Córdoba

Jaén

Teatro Cervantes (Jaén)
Teatro Cervantes (Linares)
Teatro Darymelia
Teatro Infanta Leonor (Jaén)
Teatro Maestro Álvarez Alonso

Málaga

Teatro Alameda
Auditorio Municipal de Málaga
Teatro Cánovas
Centro de Arte y Creación Joven
Teatro Cervantes (Málaga)
Teatro Echegaray
Auditorio Edgar Neville
Auditorio Eduardo Ocón
Escuela Superior de Arte Dramático de Málaga
Sala María Cristina
Teatro Romano de Málaga

Aragón

Teatro de la Estación
Teatro del Mercado
Teatro Principal (Zaragoza)

Asturias

Teatro Campoamor
Teatro Filarmónica
Teatro del Fontán
Teatro Jovellanos
Nuevo Teatro de La Felguera
Teatro Armando Palacio Valdés
Teatro Virginia

Basque Country

Teatro Arriaga
Teatro Campos Elíseos
Teatro Coliseo (Éibar)
Palacio Euskalduna
Sala Kontainer Aretoa
Palacio de Congresos y Auditorio Kursaal
Teatro Victoria Eugenia

Canary Islands

Auditorio Alfredo Kraus (Gran Canaria)
Auditorio de Tenerife
Teatro Cairasco
Teatro Chico (Santa Cruz de La Palma)
Teatro Guimerá
Teatro Leal
Teatro Pérez Galdós
Teatro Guiniguada

Cantabria

Centro de Acción Social y Cultural de Caja Cantabria
Palacio de Festivales de Cantabria
Teatro Pereda
Teatro Casino Liceo
Teatro Concha Espina
Teatro Principal (Reinosa)

Castilla La Mancha

Teatro Auditorio Buero Vallejo
Teatro Rojas
Teatro Circo de Albacete
Teatro Lope de Vega (Ocaña)
Teatro Victoria (Talavera de la Reina)

Castilla y León    

Gran Teatro Reina Sofía
Teatro Apolo (Miranda de Ebro)
Teatro Calderón (Valladolid)
Teatro Emperador
Teatro Gullón (Astorga)
Teatro Bergidum
Teatro Principal (Burgos)
Teatro Juan Bravo
Teatro Latorre
Teatro Lope de Vega (Valladolid)
Teatro Pradera
Teatro Principal de Zamora
Teatro Ramos Carrión
Teatro Trianón
Teatro Zorrilla (Valladolid)

Catalonia

Barcelona

L'Antic Teatre
Auditori AXA
Barcelona City Hall
Barcelona Teatre Musical
Biblioteca de Catalunya
Brossa Espai Escènic
Cafè-Teatre Llantiol
Círcol Maldà
Club Capitol
Club Helena
Coliseum
Espai Navae
El Liceu
El Molino
Fundació Joan Miró
Guasch Teatre
Jove Teatre Regina
L'Auditori
La Farinera del Clot
La Puntual
La Riereta Teatre
Mercat de les Flors
Sala Aurèlia Capmany
Sala Ovidi Montllor
Nau Ivanow
Palau de la Música Catalana
Palau Sant Jordi
Porta 4
Sala Atrium
Sala Beckett
Sala BeCool
Sala El Off
Sala Màgic
Sala Muntaner
Sala Raval
Sala Razzmatazz 
Sant Andreu Teatre
Sidecar Factory Club
Tantarantana Teatre
Teatre Apolo
Teatre Aquitània
Teatre Artèria Paral·lel
Teatre Borràs
Teatre CCCB (Centre de Cultura Contemporània de Barcelona)
Teatre Centre de Gràcia
Teatre Condal
Teatre del Raval
Teatre Gaudí de Barcelona
Teatre Goya
Teatre Grec
Teatre Lliure
Sala Fabià Puigserver
Espai Lliure
Teatre Nacional de Catalunya
Teatre Novedades
Teatre Poliorama
Teatre Principal (Barcelona)
Teatre Romea
Teatre Tivoli
Teatre Victòria
Teatreneu
Versus Teatre
Villarroel Teatre

Defunct

Artenbrut
Teatre Arnau
Teatre Belle Epoque
Teatre Malic
Teatro Mayor

Metropolitan area

Atrium Viladecans, in Viladecans
Auditori Barradas, in L'Hospitalet de Llobregat
Auditori de Cornellà, in Cornellà de Llobregat
Auditori Miquel Martí i Pol, in Sant Joan Despí
Estraperlo (Club del Ritme), in Badalona
Círcol Catòlic, in Badalona
Foment Cultural i Artístic, in Sant Joan Despí
Fundació La Roda, in Montcada i Reixac
La Capsa, in El Prat de Llobregat
Salamandra, in L'Hospitalet de Llobregat
Teatre-Auditori Sant Cugat, in Sant Cugat del Vallès
Teatre Blas Infante, in Badalona
Teatre Joventut, in L'Hospitalet de Llobregat
Teatre Mercè Rodoreda, in Sant Joan Despí
Teatre Modern, in El Prat de Llobregat
Teatre Núria Espert, in Sant Andreu de la Barca
Teatre Principal, in Badalona
Teatre Sagarra, in Santa Coloma de Gramenet
Teatre Zorrilla, in Badalona

Extremadura
Teatro romano de Mérida

Galicia
Palacio de la Ópera (La Coruña)
Teatro García Barbón

Madrid

Teatro de La Abadía
Teatro Albéniz
Teatro Alcázar
Teatro Alfil
Teatro Alhambra
Teatro Apolo (Madrid)
Teatro Arenal
Teatro Arniches
Teatro Bellas Artes
Teatro del Buen Retiro
Teatro Calderón (Madrid)
Teatros del Canal
Teatro de los Caños del Peral
Teatro de Capellanes
Teatro Chueca
Teatro Circo
Teatro Circo de Rivas
Teatro Coliseum
Teatro de la Comedia
Corrales de comedias de Madrid
Teatro de la Cruz
Sala Cuarta Pared
El Gayo Vallecano
Teatro Eslava
Teatro Español
Teatro Felipe
Teatro Fígaro
Teatro Fuencarral
Teatro Ideal
Teatro Infanta Isabel
Teatro Lara
Teatro La Latina
Teatro Lope de Vega (Madrid)
Teatro de Madrid
Teatro Maravillas
Teatro María Guerrero
Teatro Marquina
Teatro Martín
Monumental Cinema
Teatro Muñoz Seca
Teatro Novedades de Madrid
Nuevo Teatro Alcalá
Teatro Nuevo Apolo
Teatro Pavón
Teatro Pradillo
Teatro del Príncipe
Teatro Real
Real Cinema
Teatro Recoletos
Teatro Reina Victoria
Teatro Romea (Madrid)
Teatro Valle-Inclán
Teatro Variedades de Madrid
Teatro de la Zarzuela

Murcia

Teatro Apolo (El Algar)
Auditorio y Centro de Congresos Víctor Villegas
Auditorio y palacio de congresos El Batel
Teatro Guerra
Nuevo Teatro Circo
Teatro romano de Cartagena
Teatro Circo (Murcia)
Teatro Romea (Murcia)

Navarra
Teatro Gayarre
Palacio de Congresos y Auditorio de Navarra

Valencia
Teatro Chapí
Teatro Cervantes (Santa Eulalia)
Teatro Princesa
Teatro Principal (Valencia)

 
Lists of buildings and structures in Spain
Spain
Spanish entertainment-related lists